TTM F.C. might refer to the following football/soccer clubs:

Tshakhuma Tsha Madzivhandila F.C., South African club
TTM Thailand Tobacco Monopoly F.C., Thai club